S. Chandrahasan (6 March 1937 — 18 March 2017) was an Indian film producer and actor from Tamil Nadu, India.

Early life
Born to advocate Srinivasan and Rajalakshmi, Chandrahasan was the second of four children. His elder brother Charuhasan and younger brother Kamal Haasan worked predominantly as actors in the film industry, while his younger sister, Nalini Raghuram, is a classical dancer. As a youngster, Charuhasan practised as a singer, before being readied for a career as a lawyer. In contrary to Charuhasan, Chandrahasan maintained a very close relationship with his younger brother Kamal Haasan throughout his successful career as an actor.

Career
In 1995, he appeared as an actor in his niece Suhasini Maniratnam's directorial debut Indira. The film featured his own daughter Anu Hasan in the titular role alongside Arvind Swamy and Nassar. During the 2000s, Chandrahasan took a more active role in the management of Raaj Kamal Films International. During the problems faced during the release of Vishwaroopam (2013), Charuhasan had taken a pivotal role in mediating with the opposition.

Prior to his death, Chandrahsan completed acting in the lead role of a film titled Appathava Aattaya Pottutanga by debutant director Stephen Rangaraj. A tale of romance between two older individuals, Stephen cast Chandrahasan as he wanted someone who was known as a "respectable person" and because the romance should not be conveyed in the wrong light. The film, which featured him alongside Sheela, the mother of actor Vikranth, was completed in 2017 but had a direct release in OTT platform Sony Liv in 2021.

Personal life
Chandrahasan was married to Geethamani and has a son, Nirmal Hasan, who is settled at United States. His daughter, Anu Hasan, has appeared as an actress in Indian and British productions. Unlike his brothers, Chandrahasan was a religious, practicing Hindu. 

Geethamani has died in January 2017 aged 73. Following her death, Chandrahasan has died in March 2017 aged 81.

Death
Following a cardiac arrest, Chandrahasan died aged 81 on 18 March 2017 in London, United Kingdom. Following the death of his wife in January 2017, Chandrahasan had travelled to stay with his son Nirmal in the United States, for a change of scenery. On his return, to avoid taking a twenty three hour journey to Chennai, he had made a brief stopover in London to visit his daughter Anu. He was staying at her residence during the time of his death. The family later held a quiet funeral upon the return of his body to Chennai, before holding a remembrance meet with film industry personalities in April 2017. Apart from family, other guests included Rajinikanth, Ilaiyaraaja and Prakash Raj. Kamal Haasan later described his brother as "a father figure".

Filmography
As a producer

As an actor

References

External links

2017 deaths
Indian Tamil people
Tamil film producers
Telugu film producers
Hindi film producers
Film producers from Chennai
1934 births